Brody Blair (born December 27, 1991) is a Canadian professional boxer that has represented Canada in multiple international amateur competitions as a middleweight.

2011 Pan American Games
Born in New Glasgow, Nova Scotia, Blair won a bronze medal at the 2011 Pan American Games in the middleweight division.  After receiving a bye in the first round Blair defeated Mario Bernal of El Salvador in the quarterfinals 24–12 to advance to the medal round.  In the semifinals Blair lost to eventual gold medalist Emilio Correa of Cuba 30–7.

2012 Olympic Qualification Attempt
At the 2012 American Boxing Olympic Qualification Tournament Blair won two bouts to advance to the quarterfinals as a middleweight.  In the quarterfinals he lost to Junior Castillo of Dominican Republic.  Blair needed Castillo to win the tournament to advance to the Olympics, but Castillo lost in the finals.

2013 AIBA World Boxing Championships
At the 2013 AIBA World Boxing Championships in the middleweight division Blair defeated Sanjin-Pol Vrgoč of Croatia and Mahmoud Shabab of the Palestinian territories in the first two rounds 3–0 each before losing to Zoltán Harcsa of Hungary 3–0 in the third round.

Blair went on to represent Canada at the 2014 Commonwealth Games.

Titles
2009 – Canadian Youth Champion
2011 – Canadian Senior Champion

Professional career
Blair turned professional on May 27, 2017 in Fredericton, New Brunswick and won by TKO in the 2nd round. He won his second professional fight in November.

References

1991 births
Boxers at the 2014 Commonwealth Games
Commonwealth Games competitors for Canada
Living people
Middleweight boxers
People from New Glasgow, Nova Scotia
Sportspeople from Nova Scotia
Canadian male boxers
Boxers at the 2011 Pan American Games
Pan American Games bronze medalists for Canada
Pan American Games medalists in boxing
Medalists at the 2011 Pan American Games